List of works by or about Kelefa Sanneh, American journalist and music critic.

Books

Essays and reporting

Notes 

Bibliographies by writer
Bibliographies of American writers